Elizabeth Chase Olsen (born February 16, 1989) is an American actress. Born in Sherman Oaks, California, Olsen began acting at age four. She starred in her debut film role in the thriller Martha Marcy May Marlene in 2011, for which she was acclaimed and nominated for a Critics' Choice Movie Award among other accolades, followed by a role in the horror film Silent House. Olsen received a BAFTA Rising Star Award nomination and graduated from New York University two years later.

Olsen gained worldwide recognition for her portrayal of Wanda Maximoff / Scarlet Witch in the Marvel Cinematic Universe media franchise, appearing in the superhero films Avengers: Age of Ultron (2015), Captain America: Civil War (2016), Avengers: Infinity War (2018), Avengers: Endgame (2019), and Doctor Strange in the Multiverse of Madness (2022), as well as the miniseries WandaVision (2021). Her performance in WandaVision garnered her nominations for a Primetime Emmy Award and a Golden Globe Award. 

Outside of her work with Marvel, Olsen starred in the monster film Godzilla (2014), the mystery film Wind River (2017), and the dramedy Ingrid Goes West (2017). She executive produced and starred in the drama series Sorry for Your Loss (2018–2019), earning a Critics' Choice Television Award nomination for her role as a widow.

Early life and education 
Elizabeth Chase Olsen was born on February 16, 1989, in Sherman Oaks, California. Her mother, Jarnie, is a former dancer, while her father, Dave, is a real estate agent. She is the younger sister of twin fashion designers Mary-Kate and Ashley Olsen, who became successful television and film actresses as children. Olsen also has an older brother, a younger half-brother, and a younger half-sister. Her parents divorced in 1996.

Olsen began acting when she was four years old, appearing in Mary-Kate and Ashley's projects, including the 1994 television film How the West Was Fun and the straight-to-video series The Adventures of Mary-Kate & Ashley. As a child, she took acting classes and spent time at musical theatre camp. Olsen nearly quit pursuing acting in 2004 due to the media attention toward Mary-Kate's eating disorder. She went to Campbell Hall School in Studio City, California. Olsen attended New York University (NYU)'s Tisch School of the Arts, during which she took classes at Atlantic Theater Company and spent a semester at the Moscow Art Theatre School in Russia. She attained understudy roles in the 2008 off-Broadway production of the play Dust and the 2009 Broadway production of the play Impressionism, which led to her securing an agent. Olsen graduated from NYU in January 2013.

Career

Early roles and acclaim (2011–2014) 

Olsen made her film debut in the 2011 thriller film Martha Marcy May Marlene. The film, along with her performance, received critical acclaim following its premiere at the Sundance Film Festival. Olsen earned several award nominations for her portrayal of the titular Martha, a young woman suffering from delusions after fleeing her life in a cult and returning to her family, including those for the Critics' Choice Movie Award for Best Actress and the Independent Spirit Award for Best Female Lead. She attributed her interest in the character to her own fascination with mental illnesses. Olsen next appeared in the horror film Silent House, which garnered her "rave reviews". Despite premiering at the Sundance Film Festival alongside Martha Marcy May Marlene, it was released in 2012, during which she also starred in the thriller Red Lights and the comedy Liberal Arts.

In January 2013, Olsen garnered a nomination for the BAFTA Rising Star Award at the 66th British Academy Film Awards. She played Edie Parker, novelist Jack Kerouac's first wife and the author of the Beat Generation memoir You'll Be Okay, in the biographical drama Kill Your Darlings. She appeared in the American remake of the 2003 South Korean film Oldboy, playing Marie Sebastian, a nurse who helps the protagonist, played by Josh Brolin, find his daughter. That same year, she starred as the titular Juliet in an off-Broadway production of the play Romeo and Juliet by William Shakespeare. The New York Times critic Ben Brantley described her portrayal as "alternating between saucy petulance and hysteria". She played the leading role in In Secret, a film adaptation of Émile Zola's 1867 novel Thérèse Raquin. The film was released in February 2014. Later that year, Olsen starred in the monster film Godzilla, opposite Bryan Cranston and Aaron Taylor-Johnson, which received positive reviews and grossed $529 million against a $160 million production budget. She and Dakota Fanning co-starred as teenage girls in Brooklyn in the film Very Good Girls, released that same year, which Josh Duboff of Vanity Fair characterized as unfavorably reviewed.

Marvel Cinematic Universe and continued success (2015–present) 
Olsen starred in the 2015 superhero film Avengers: Age of Ultron, a sequel to The Avengers, joining the Marvel Cinematic Universe media franchise. In the film, she portrayed Wanda Maximoff / Scarlet Witch, which marked the comic book character's film debut. She first appeared as the character in a post-credits scene of the 2014 film Captain America: The Winter Soldier, alongside Aaron Taylor-Johnson, who portrayed Maximoff's brother, Pietro. Olsen played the part with an accent originating from a fictional country called Sokovia, which she described as similar to Slovakian. She reprised the role in Captain America: Civil War (2016), Avengers: Infinity War (2018), and Avengers: Endgame (2019), the last of which became the second highest-grossing film of all time. With the role, Olsen rose to fame.

Olsen portrayed Audrey Williams, the wife, manager, and duet partner of singer Hank Williams, portrayed by Tom Hiddleston, in the 2015 biographical film I Saw the Light, directed by Marc Abraham. In 2017, she starred as a novice FBI agent in the mystery film Wind River and a social media influencer in the comedy-drama film Ingrid Goes West, both of which were released in August to critical praise. Vultures David Edelstein found Olsen's "incongruously high-schoolish demeanor" in Wind River problematic, while Peter Travers of Rolling Stone wrote that she gave a "major eye-opener of a performance" in Ingrid Goes West, deeming it "toxic perfection". The following year, she appeared in the Netflix film Kodachrome, playing a caregiver to a photographer, played by Ed Harris. Olsen executive produced and starred as a young widow named Leigh Shaw in the Facebook Watch web television series Sorry for Your Loss, which premiered in September 2018. She said the three years it took to develop the series enabled her to immerse herself in Shaw's impulses. Critics reviewed the series positively, and Olsen's performance, which earned her a nomination for the Critics' Choice Television Award for Best Actress in a Drama Series, was noted as "stunning", "disciplined and sharp", as well as "slyly sympathetic". The series was canceled in January 2020 after two seasons.

Alongside Paul Bettany as Vision, Olsen played Maximoff again in the superhero miniseries WandaVision, which premiered on Disney+ in January 2021. In addition to complimenting Olsen and Bettany's chemistry, critics praised the cast, with Voxs Alex Abad-Santos writing Olsen was brilliant in her portrayal and Linda Holmes of NPR highlighting her "indelible central performance" in their respective reviews. Olsen earned a Primetime Emmy Award nomination for Outstanding Lead Actress in a Limited or Anthology Series or Movie and Golden Globe Award nomination for Best Actress – Miniseries or Television Film for her performance. She reprised the role in the film Doctor Strange in the Multiverse of Madness, which was released in May 2022 to mixed reviews. Olsen's performance received praise, with Owen Gleiberman of Variety writing that it "generates an operatic fire".

Olsen is set to star as housewife Candy Montgomery in Love and Death, an HBO Max limited series about a 1980 murder in Texas.

Personal life 
Olsen says she became an atheist at the age of 13 because she believes "religion should be about community and having a place to go in prayer, not something that should determine women's freedoms." She formerly held a real estate license in New York, which she obtained after first moving there. Olsen is an ambassador for the company Bobbi Brown Cosmetics. She and actor Boyd Holbrook were in a relationship from 2011 to 2014. 

Olsen became engaged to musician Robbie Arnett, of the American band Milo Greene, in July 2019 after three years of dating. The two secretly married before the COVID-19 pandemic, having eloped. She and Arnett live in Los Angeles. They co-wrote a children's book, titled Hattie Harmony: Worry Detective, which was released in June 2022.

Filmography

Film

Television

Theatre

Accolades

Notes

References

External links 

1989 births
20th-century American actresses
21st-century American actresses
Actresses from Los Angeles
American child actresses
American film actresses
American television actresses
American people of English descent
American people of Norwegian descent
American atheists
21st-century atheists
Living people
Olsen family
People from Sherman Oaks, Los Angeles
Tisch School of the Arts alumni